Neuradopsis is a genus of flowering plants belonging to the family Neuradaceae.

Its native range is Southern Africa.

Species:

Neuradopsis austroafricana 
Neuradopsis bechuanensis

References

Neuradaceae
Malvales genera